Vagiphantes is a monotypic genus of Asian sheet weavers containing the single species, Vagiphantes vaginatus. It was first described by Michael I. Saaristo & A. V. Tanasevitch in 2004, and is only found in Asia.

See also
 List of Linyphiidae species (Q–Z)

References

Linyphiidae
Monotypic Araneomorphae genera
Spiders of Asia